Patrick Bienert (born 1980) is a German photographer who works on long-term projects of portrait, landscape and documentary photography. He predominantly documents youth culture and transformation on the borders of Eastern Europe. In January 2020, he published the book East End of Europe, about a pro-European generation in Georgia. In 2017, Bienert published the book Wake Up Nights, about young nightlife culture in Ukraine.

His projects are grounded in cultures and identity in relation to the history and its traces between the land and its inhabitants.

Life and work
Bienert grew up in Munich, Germany, where he studied photography at the Bayerische Staatslehranstalt für Photographie and the Munich University of Applied Sciences until 2006.

His photography project East End of Europe about a pro-European generation in Georgia was published in 2020 as a book by Kahl Editions. Another Magazine included the monograph in its list of must-have photo books in 2020. Brad Feuerhelm wrote, "This is a lovely book full of promise and suffers little from the exceptional portraits that Patrick Bienert produces."

Other bodies of Bienert's work include Asmara (2013), in which he photographed both the modernist architecture of Asmara, the capital of Eritrea, from the period of the Italian colonisation, and the city's current inhabitants; Clothing Trade, a project about the second-hand clothing industry in Tunisia (2018); and Banks of Dnister (2019), for which he followed the Dnister river along its route through Moldova, the breakaway state Transnistria and Ukraine, portraying the youth culture and the landscapes in the post-Soviet states.

Bienert's work has been published in magazines including The New York Times Magazine, The Atlantic, Double Magazine and Zeit Magazin.

In 2018 he received a grant from the Goethe-Institut to work on his project about the second-hand clothing industry in Tunisia.

His personal projects have been exhibited at OFR Galerie in Paris; Deichtorhallen, Hamburg, Germany;  Amphithéâtre de Carthage, Tunisia; and Store Studios, London.

Commissioned by the fashion brand Jil Sander, Bienert photographed at the Italian island of Ponza for the brand's pre-fall 2020 advertisements.

Publications
Wake Up Nights. Self-published, 2017. Edition of 500 copies.
East End of Europe. With an essay by Florian Illies. Kahl, 2020. . Edition of 500 copies.

Exhibitions
Asmara, Deichtorhallen, Hamburg, Germany, 2013
Wake up Nights, Store Studios London, 2018
Post Soviet Visions, Wake up Nights, Calvert 22 Foundation, London, 2018
Wake up Nights, Capitis Studios, Berlin, 2018
Wake up Nights, Ngorongoro, Berlin, 2018
Clothing Trade, Tbilisi Photo Festival, Tbilisi, Georgia, 2019
Conversations, Webber Gallery, London, 2018
East End of Europe, Republic Square, Tbilisi, Georgia, 2019
Clothing Trade, Amphithéâtre de Carthage, Tunisia, 2019
East End of Europe, OFR Galerie, Paris, 2020

Films
Kiev (2018) – short film

Awards
Rovinj Photodays Award, Clothing Trade, Grand Prix, 2020

Notes

References

External links

Am östlichen Ende Europas – interview with Carmen Maiwald

1980 births
21st-century German photographers
Documentary photographers
Landscape photographers
Living people
People from Munich
Photographers from Bavaria
Photography in Ukraine
Portrait photographers